Bettina is a female name predominantly found in the Italian and German languages. This name has various interpreted meanings and origins.

In Italian, Bettina originated as a diminutive of the names Elisabetta and Benedetta. Benedetta is the Italian feminine form of Benedict, meaning "Blessed," while Elisabetta is the Italian form of Elizabeth, which itself comes from the Hebrew name Elisheva or Elisheba, meaning "my God is an oath".

The name has several variations including Bettine and Betina, and though it is a diminutive itself, it can be shortened to Betty, Bette, Ina, or Tina.

People
It was the professional name of Simone Micheline Graziani, one of the most famous fashion models of the 1950s and an early muse of designer Hubert de Givenchy - Simone was given the name "Bettina" by designer Pierre Balmain.

Bettina d'Andrea (died 1335), Italian lawyer and professor
Bettina von Arnim (1785–1859), German writer and novelist
Bettina Ehrlich (1903–1985), artist, writer, illustrator
Bettina Bäumer (born 1940), Austrian-born Indian scholar of religion
Bettina Aptheker (born 1944), American political activist, feminist professor and author
Bettina Werner (born 1965), Pioneering Artist of the World's 1st salt crystal paintings
Bettina Sabatini (born 1966), Italian marathon runner
Bettina Banoun (born 1972), Norwegian tax lawyer, partner at Wiersholm and actor
Bettina Bush (born 1973), voice actor and singer who was the original voice of Rainbow Brite.
Bettina Grossman (1927–2021), American visual artist
Bettina Linn (1905–1962), American novelist and college professor
Bettina Oneto (born 1957), Peruvian actress and comedian
Betina Popova (born 1996), Russian ice dancer
Bettina Meiser, researcher of the psychosocial aspects of genetics and cancer
Bettina Kupfer (born 1963), German actress and writer
Bettina Santo Domingo, American filmmaker
Bettina Wiesmann (born 1966), German politician
Bettina Wiegmann (born 1971), German footballer
Bettina Vollath (born 1962), Austrian politician

Fictional characters

"Bettina" was the name of the woman artist (and her ranch) that the Tom Hanks character met at the end of the film Cast Away while delivering her package. He had retrieved the Bettina package years earlier from the ocean, while stranded on a tiny island following a plane crash.

References

External links
 http://www.behindthename.com/php/search.php?nmd=n&terms=bettina&submit=Go

Feminine given names
English feminine given names
German feminine given names
Italian feminine given names
Spanish feminine given names